In 2015 it was estimated, as per official statistics, that there are 47,291 Shiite mosques and 10,344 Sunni mosques in Iran.

List of mosques in Iran 
This is a list of mosques in Iran.

Ardabil Province 

 Jome mosque
 Jameh Mosque of Germi
 Jameh Mosque of Namin

East Azerbaijan Province 

 Jameh Mosque of Ahar
 Jameh Mosque of Tabriz
 Jameh Mosque of Sarab
 Hajj Safar Ali Mosque
 Saheb-ol-Amr Mosque
 Jameh Mosque of Marand
 Jameh Mosque of Mehrabad
 Blue Mosque, Tabriz
 Stone Tark Mosque
 Mirpanj Mosque

Gilan Province 
 Hajj Samad Khan Mosque
 Chahar Padshahan

Golestan Province 

 Jameh Mosque of Gorgan

Fars Province 

 Jameh Mosque of Atigh
 Vakil Mosque
 Nasir-ol-molk Mosque
 Jameh Mosque of Lar
 Jameh Mosque of Kabir Neyriz
 Jameh Mosque of Jahrom
 Jameh Mosque of Darab
 Jameh Mosque of Arsanjan

Hamadan Province 

 Jameh Mosque of Sarabi

Hormozgan Province 

 Malek bin Abbas Mosque
 Jameh Mosque of Bastak
 Jameh Mosque of Bandar Abbas
 Jameh Mosque of Qiblah
 Jameh Mosque of Qeshm

Isfahan Province 

 Agha Bozorg Mosque
 Jameh Mosque of Ashtarjan
 Jameh Mosque of Isfahan
 Jameh Mosque of Khansar
 Jameh Mosque of Khozan
 Jameh Mosque of Zavareh
 Jameh Mosque of Golpayegan
 Jameh Mosque of Nain
 Jameh Mosque of Natanz
 Jameh Mosque of Nushabad
 Jarchi Mosque
 Agha Nour Mosque
 Ali Gholi Agha Mosque
 Barsian mosque and minaret
 Darvazeh No Mosque
 Dashti Mosque
 Rahim Khan Mosque
 Gar mosque and minaret
 Ilchi Mosque
 Roknolmolk Mosque
 Kaj Mosque
 Maghsoudbeyk Mosque
 Meydan Mosque, Kashan
 Mohammad Jafar Abadei Mosque
 Hakim Mosque, Isfahan
 Seyyed Mosque (Isfahan)
 Shah Mosque (Isfahan)
 Sheikh Lotfollah Mosque
 Safa Mosque
 Tabriziha Mosque
 Lonban Mosque
 Mesri Mosque
 Hafshuye Mosque

Kerman Province 

 Jameh Mosque of Kerman
 Malek Mosque
 Hajj Agha Ali Mosque
 Pamenar Mosque, Kerman

Kermanshah Province 

 Jameh Mosque of Kermanshah
Jameh Mosque of Shafei
 Emad o dolah Mosque
 Abdullah ibn Umar Mosque
 Hajj Shahbazkhan Mosque

Khuzestan Province 

 Jameh Mosque of Dezful
 Jameh Mosque of Shushtar
 Rangooniha Mosque
 Jameh Mosque of Khorramshahr

Kurdistan Province 

 Dar ul-Ihsan Mosque
 Hajar Khatoon Mosque

Lorestan Province 

 Jameh Mosque of Borujerd
 Soltani Mosque of Borujerd

Markazi Province 

 Jameh Mosque of Arak

 Agha Zia ol Din Mosque

 Jameh Mosque of Saveh

Mazandaran Province 

 Farahabad Mosque
 Jameh Mosque of Amol
 Jameh Mosque of Babol
 Jameh Mosque of Sari

Qazvin Province 

 Jameh Mosque of Qazvin
 Al-Nabi Mosque, Qazvin
 Heidarieh Mosque, Qazvin
 Jameh Mosque of Qerveh

Qom Province 

 Jameh Mosque of Qom
 Jameh Mosque of Pachian
 Imam Hasan al-Askari Mosque
 Azam mosque of Qom
 Chehel Akhtaran Mosque
 Jamkaran Mosque

Razavi Khorasan Province 
 Gonbad Kabud Mosque
 Goharshad Mosque
 Haji Jalal Mosque
 Howz-e Ma'jardar Mosque
 Jameh Mosque of Gonabad
 Jameh Mosque of Kashmar
 Jameh Mosque of Marandiz
 Jameh Mosque of Nishapur
 Jameh Mosque of Radkan
 Jameh Mosque of Sabzevar
 Khosrow Shir Mosque
 Pamenar Mosque, Sabzevar
 Shah Mosque (Mashhad)
 Sheikh Fayz Mosque
 Qadamgah Mosque

Semnan Province 

 Jameh Mosque of Aradan
 Imam Mosque, Semnan
 Jameh Mosque of Semnan
 Jameh Mosque of Damghan
 Jameh Mosque of Shahrud
 Jameh Mosque of Forumad
 Tarikhaneh
 Sheikh Bastami Mosque
 Pamenar Mosque, Mehdishahr

thumb|Jameh Mosque of zahedan

Sistan and Baluchestan Province 

 Jameh Mosque of Makki

thumb|Jameh Mosque of ferdows

South Khorasan Province 

 Mahvid Mosque
 Jameh Mosque of Fathabad
 Jameh Mosque of Ferdows
 Jameh Mosque of Raqqeh

Tehran Province 

 Jameh Mosque of Tehran
 Jameh Mosque of Damavand
 Jameh Mosque of Varamin
 Sepahsalar Mosque
 Shah Mosque (Tehran)
 Fakhr al-Dawla Mosque
 Mirza Mousa Mosque
 Hedayat Mosque
 Lorzadeh Mosque
Vali-e-Asr Mosque

West Azerbaijan Province 

 Jameh Mosque of Urmia
 Jameh Mosque of Takab
 Dash Aghlian Mosque
 Sardar Mosque
 Menareh Mosque
 Hojjatieh Mosque

Yazd Province 

 Jameh Mosque of Ardakan
 Amir Chakhmaq Mosque
 Jameh Mosque of Abarkuh
 Jameh Mosque of Eslamiyeh
 Jameh Mosque of Fahraj
 Jameh Mosque of Yazd
 Zir Deh Mosque
 Chahar Suq And Hajj Muhammad Husayn Mosque

Zanjan Province 

 Khanom Mosque
 Jameh Mosque of Zanjan
 Jameh Mosque of Sojas

Haram And Tomb 

 Imam Reza shrine
 Fatima Masumeh Shrine
 Shah Abdol-Azim shrine
 Mausoleum of Ruhollah Khomeini
 Bibi Shahr Banu Shrine
 Tomb of Daniel
 Tomb of Hassan Modarres
 Sheikh Ahmad-e Jami mausoleum complex
 Imamzadeh Davood
 Imamzadeh Hamzah, Tabriz
 Imamzadeh Saleh, Shemiran
 Imamzadeh Hamzeh, Kashmar
 Imamzade Hossein, Qazvin
 Imamzadeh Seyed Mohammad
 Imamzadeh Seyed Morteza
 Imamzadeh Shahreza
 Imamzadeh Shahzadeh Hoseyn
 Imamzadeh Ja'far, Borujerd
 Imamzadeh Hadi
 Imamzadeh Esmaeil and Isaiah mausoleum
 Hosseinieh Azam Zanjan Mosque
 Shah Cheragh
 Monar Jonban
 Kushk Complex

References

External links 
 

Iran

Mosques